The Iraq War began in 2003 and involved a two-phase conflict comprising an initial invasion of Iraq led by U.S. and UK forces and a longer, eight-year phase of occupation and fighting with insurgents.

Various wars and insurgencies have engulfed large parts of Iraq almost continuously for many decades.  Since the breakup of the Ottoman Empire, each of the following wars killed at least one thousand persons in less than one year or resulted in hundreds of thousands of refugees or internally displaced persons:
 Mesopotamian campaign (1914–1918)
 Iraqi revolt of 1920 against the British
 Simele massacre (August 1933)
 Anglo-Iraqi War and Farhud (1941)
 1959 Mosul uprising
 First Iraqi–Kurdish War (1961–1970)
 Ramadan Revolution (February 1963)
 Second Iraqi–Kurdish War (1974–1975)
 1974–75 Shatt al-Arab conflict
 Ba'athist Arabization campaigns in North Iraq (1978–1979)
 1979–1980 Shia uprising in Iraq
 Iran–Iraq War (1980–1988)
 1983–1986 Kurdish rebellions in Iraq
 Anfal campaign (1986–1989)
 Iraqi invasion of Kuwait (1990)
 Sanctions against Iraq (1990–2003), which devastated the civilian economy of Iraq; an especially repressive government publicly attributed deaths of a half-million civilian children to the sanctions.
 Gulf War (1991) (sometimes identified as the first Iraq war)
 1991 Iraqi uprisings
 Operation Northern Iraq (1992)
 Iraqi Kurdish Civil War (1994–1997)
 1998 bombing of Iraq
 The Iraqi conflict (2003–present) included various phases of insurgency and open conflict:
 2003 invasion of Iraq
 Iraq War (2003–2011)
 Iraqi insurgency (2003–2006)
 Iraqi insurgency (2003–2011)
 Iraqi civil war (2006–2008), civil war mainly among Islamic State of Iraq, other sectarian militant groups, and Iraqi forces and their respective allies
 Iraqi insurgency (2011–2013), the surge in  violence involving the Islamic State of Iraq that occurred immediately following the end of the 2003 to 2011 Iraq War
 War in Iraq (2013–2017), conflict with Islamic State of Iraq and the Levant that began when the initial two-year-long insurgency escalated in December 2013
 Islamic State insurgency in Iraq (2017–present), low-level ISIL insurgency following territorial defeat of ISIL in Iraq in 2017
 2017 Iraqi–Kurdish conflict
 2019–2021 Iraqi protests
 2021–2022 Iraqi political crisis

See also 
 List of wars involving Iraq
 Military history of Iraq

 Battle of Baghdad (disambiguation)
 Gulf War (disambiguation)
 Invasion of Iraq (disambiguation)
 Iraqi Civil War (disambiguation)